The 9mm Browning Long [9 x 20mm SR] is a military centerfire pistol cartridge developed in 1903 for the FN Model 1903 adopted by Belgium, France, Estonia, the Netherlands, and Sweden.

Description
9mm Browning Long is similar to the 9×19mm Parabellum, but has a slightly longer casing and is semi-rimmed; the cartridge headspaces on the rim. The cartridge was developed by FN to be used in the blowback-operated Model 1903, a scaled-up version of the Colt 1903. Using a more powerful cartridge, such as the 9×19mm Parabellum, would have required a locked-breech design. Ammunition was produced in Belgium, France, England, Sweden and the United States. There was some production in Germany during World War I for the Ottoman Empire, and the cartridge was also used in South Africa.

The cartridge is now obsolete and it is hard to find reloadable brass for this ammunition; one option handloaders have is to take the .38 Super and shorten it to the right length.

Prvi Partizan in Serbia manufactured 9mm Browning Long ammunition into the 2000s.

There is reloading data available on a few websites and in some handloading manuals, e.g. the Norwegian Ladeboken.
Ladeboken:

 Powder:  N340.
 Bullet:  Norma J
 Length: 

See also
 9 mm caliber
 List of handgun cartridges

References

Military cartridges
Pistol and rifle cartridges